The 2005–06 season was Coventry City's 86th season in The Football League and their 5th consecutive season in the Football League Championship. Along with competing in the Championship, the club also participated in the FA Cup and Football League Cup. The season covers the period from 1 July 2005 to 30 June 2006.

Final league table

Results
Coventry City's score comes first

Legend

Championship

League Cup

FA Cup

Season statistics

Starts & goals

|}

Notes: 
Player substitutions are not included.

Goalscorers
12 players have scored for the Coventry City first team during the 2005–06 season.
65 goals were scored in total during the 2005–06 season.
60 in the Championship
3 in the League Cup
2 in the FA Cup
The top goalscorer was Gary McSheffrey with 17 goals.

Yellow Cards

19 players have been booked for the Coventry City first team during the 2005–06 season.
90 bookings were received in total during the 2005–06 season.
81 in the Championship
4 in the League Cup
5 in the FA Cup
The most booked player was Gary McSheffrey with 11 cards.

Red cards
4 players were sent off for the Coventry City first team during the 2005–06 season.
4 players were sent off in total during the 2005–06 season.
4 in the Championship
0 in the League Cup
0 in the FA Cup
The most sent off players were Michael Doyle, Matt Heath, Stephen Hughes and Claus Bech Jørgensen all with one sending off.

Transfers

Transfers in

Transfers out

Loans in

Loans out

References

External links
 Official Site: 2006/2007 Fixtures & Results
 BBC Sport – Club Stats
 Soccerbase – Results | Squad Stats | Transfers

Coventry City F.C. seasons
Coventry City